Some Blues But Not the Kind That's Blue is an album by jazz composer, bandleader and keyboardist Sun Ra and his Arkestra recorded in 1977, originally released on Ra's Saturn label in 1977, and rereleased on CD on Atavistic's Unheard Music Series in 2008.

Reception
The Allmusic review by Sean Westergaard awarded the album 4 stars stating "Although recorded about a decade apart, Some Blues But Not the Kind That's Blue is of a piece with Blue Delight: mostly standards albums that really put the spotlight on Sun Ra's piano playing and the tenor artistry of John Gilmore. Although the Arkestra is notorious for its outside playing and cacophonous tendencies, this album shows they could play it straight as well as anyone in the game. Wonderful stuff".

Track listing
All compositions by Sun Ra except as indicated
 "Some Blues But Not the Kind Thats Blue" - 8:15	
 "II'll Get By" (Fred E. Ahlert, Roy Turk) - 7:18	
 "My Favorite Things" (Oscar Hammerstein II, Richard Rodgers) - 10:01
 "Untitled" - 7:06 Bonus track on CD reissue	
 "Nature Boy" (eden ahbez) - 8:52	
 "Tenderly" (Walter Gross, Jack Lawrence) - 7:30
 "Black Magic" (Harold Arlen, Johnny Mercer) - 8:38	
 "'ll Get By" [alternate take I] (Ahlert, Turk) - 7:24 Bonus track on CD reissue
 "I'll Get By" [alternate take II] (Ahlert, Turk) - 6:42 Bonus track on CD reissue

Personnel
Sun Ra - piano (tracks 1–7), organ (tracks 8 & 9)
Akh Tal Ebah  - trumpet (tracks 1–7), flugelhorn (track 8)
Marshall Allen - alto saxophone, flute, oboe (tracks 1–7)
Danny Davis - alto saxophone, flute (tracks 1–7)
John Gilmore - tenor saxophone, percussion (tracks 1-7 & 9)
James Jacson - flute, bassoon (tracks 1–7)
Eloe Omoe - bass clarinet, flute (tracks 1–7)
Ronnie Boykins (tracks 8 & 9), Richard Williams (tracks 1–7) - bass
Luqman Ali - drums (tracks 1–7)
Atakatune - congas (tracks 1–7)

References 

Sun Ra albums
El Saturn Records albums
Atavistic Records albums
1977 albums